Levon or Lévon is an Armenian given name (in Armenian Լեւոն) equivalent to Leon. It is also a surname.  Notable people with the name include:

Given name
King Leo (disambiguation), a series of individuals known as King Levon (in Armenian)
Levon Altonian (born 1936), Lebanese football player
Levon Ambartsumian (born 1955), Armenian classical violinist and conductor
Levon Ananyan (1946–2013), Armenian journalist and translator
Levon Aronian (born 1982), Armenian chess Grandmaster
Levon Babujian (born 1986), Armenian chess Grandmaster
Levon Chailakhyan (1928-2009), Russian physiologist, biophysicist, and embryologist of Armenian origin
Levon Chaushian (born 1946), Armenian composer, vice-president of the Armenian Composers’ Union and chairman of the Armenian Composers Assembly
Levon Chilingirian (born 1948), UK-based Armenian violinist, founder of the Chilingirian Quartet
Levon Chookaszian (born 1952), Armenian art historian and the UNESCO Chair of Armenian Art History
Levon Davidian (1944-2009), Iranian-Armenian politician, member of Iranian parliament
Levon Geghamyan (born 1977), Armenian Greco Roman wrestler
Levon Ashotovich Grigorian (1947–1975), Soviet Armenian chess player
Levon Hayrapetyan (born 1989), Armenian football player
Levon Helm (1940–2012), American rock musician, singer and actor, member of The Band
Levon Ichkhanian, Lebanese Armenian Canadian guitarist of stringed instruments specialist, in Jazz, World and Traditional music
Levon "Bo" Jones, American former death row inmate for 15 years, convicted and sentenced to death in 1993 with conviction overturned in 2006, released from prison in 2008
Levon Julfalakyan (born 1964), Soviet Armenian Greco-Roman wrestler
Levon Kemalyan (1907–1976), Armenian-American model railroading entrepreneur 
Levon Kendall (born 1984), Canadian basketball player
Levon Khechoyan (1955–2014), Armenian writer and novelist
Levon Khachigian (born 1964), Armenian Australian medical scientist in vascular cell and molecular biology, cardiovascular and cancer pathology
Levon Kirkland (born 1969), American football linebacker in the National Football League
Levon Larents (1875-1915), or levon Kirisciyan, Ottoman Armenian writer, translator, journalist, editor, novelist, poet, and teacher. During the Armenian Genocide, deported and killed
Levon Louis, electronic musician, sound designer, record producer, and video game audio director
Lévon Minassian, French-Armenian duduk player
Levon Mirzoyan, Secretary of Communist Party of the Azeri SSR (1926-1929) and the First Secretary of the Communist Party of the Kazakh SSR (1936-1938) executed during the Great Purge
Levon Mkrtchyan (born 1953), Armenian film and documentary film director
Levon Orbeli (1882–1958), or Leon Orbeli, Armenian physiologist 
Levon Pashalian (1868-1943), Ottoman Armenian short story writer, journalist, editor, novelist, and politician
Levon Pogosian, Canadian Armenian professor of astrophysics
Lévon Sayan (born 1934), or Levon Sanosyan, French-Armenian impresario and producer, operatic tenor
Levon Shant (1869-1951), Armenian playwright, novelist, poet, and founder of the Hamazkayin National Cultural Foundation
Levon Ter-Petrosyan (born 1945), Armenian politician. First President of Armenia from 1991 to 1998
Levon Zourabian (born 1964), Armenian politician

Middle name
Robert Levon Been (born 1978), American indie rock bass guitarist, guitarist, and singer

Surname
August Alexander Levón (1820-1875), Finnish entrepreneur and businessman 
Elen Levon (born 1994), Ukrainian-born Australian singer, songwriter, and dancer

See also
LaVon (given name)

Armenian masculine given names